Jackson Square station is a Massachusetts Bay Transportation Authority (MBTA) Orange Line rapid transit station located on Centre Street near Columbus Avenue in the Jamaica Plain neighborhood of Boston, Massachusetts. The station opened in 1987 as part of the Southwest Corridor project.

History

The station opened in 1987 along with the rest of the southern Orange Line stations. In 2004, the MBTA added murals as well as better lighting and new sidewalks after a spree of violent crimes near the station. The improvements at the station were designed to reduce criminal activity as well as provide a more welcoming atmosphere for transit riders. Additional murals were added in December 2007. The entire Orange Line, including Jackson Square station, was closed from August 19 to September 18, 2022, during maintenance work.

The MBTA plans to add a second platform elevator, rebuild the existing elevator, and make other repairs to the station. Design work reached 30% completion in 2021 and 75% completion in 2022. The MBTA also plans to convert the currently-southbound-only busway to bidrectional bus traffic in 2024 as part of construction of bus lanes on Columbus Avenue.

Bus connections

Jackson Square station is served by five MBTA bus routes: 
: Roslindale Square–
: – via Talbot Ave
: –Jackson Square station
: Centre Street & Eliot Street–
: Jackson Square station–Ruggles station
All of the routes operate into an off-street busway located adjacent to the station. The 29 and 44 terminate at Jackson Square.

References

External links

 MBTA – Jackson Square
MBTA – Elevator Accessibility Upgrades
 Centre Street entrance from Google Maps Street View

Jamaica Plain, Boston
Orange Line (MBTA) stations
Railway stations located underground in Boston
Railway stations in the United States opened in 1987